Zackariah Jozef Kotwica (born 12 January 1996) is an English footballer who plays for  side Swindon Supermarine, where he plays as a forward.

Playing career

Cheltenham Town
Kotwica began his career with Cheltenham Town and made his professional debut in a 2–2 draw with Burton Albion on 3 August 2013. Kotwica scored his first professional goal for the club in a 1–1 draw with Mansfield Town on 13 December 2014.

Prior to the 2015/16 campaign, he joined Southern League Premier Division club Cirencester Town on loan until January. On 9 December 2015 it was announced that his contract will not be renewed at the end of the season. On 1 January loan was extended till the end of the season.

Gloucester City
He later joined Gloucester City on non-contract basis for the 2016/17 season. In October 2017, Kotwica joined Salisbury on a month's loan, and went on to score 5 goals in 5 games.

Tamworth
On 24 November 2017, Kotwica signed for Conference North side Tamworth for an undisclosed fee, to fill the void left by the sale of Reece Styche to Darlington.

Statistics

References

External links

Zack Kotwica at Aylesbury United

1996 births
Living people
English footballers
Association football forwards
Cheltenham Town F.C. players
Bishop's Cleeve F.C. players
Gloucester City A.F.C. players
Evesham United F.C. players
Cirencester Town F.C. players
Salisbury F.C. players
Tamworth F.C. players
Swindon Supermarine F.C. players
English Football League players
English people of Polish descent